Gonipterus is a genus of weevils in the family Curculionidae. There are approximately 20 described species in the genus, most of which are native to Australia. They are all plant feeders and many are specific to a single host species. Gonipterus gibberus and Gonipterus scutellatus infest a number of species of Eucalyptus and have spread to other parts of the world where these trees have been planted.

Species
Species include:

Gonipterus balteatus   Pascoe, 1870
Gonipterus bimaculatus   Lea, 1927
Gonipterus bruchi Marshall, 1927
Gonipterus cancellata Lea, 1901
Gonipterus cinnamomeus Pascoe, 1870
Gonipterus cionoides Pascoe, 1870
Gonipterus citrophagus Lea, 1897
Gonipterus conicollis Lea, 1927
Gonipterus crassipes Lea, 1897
Gonipterus exaratus   Fåhraeus, 1840
Gonipterus excavata   Boisduval, 1835
Gonipterus excavatus Boisduval, 1835
Gonipterus excavifrons Lea, 1897
Gonipterus fasciatus Boisduval, 1835
Gonipterus ferrugatus Pascoe, 1870
Gonipterus geminatus Lea, 1897
Gonipterus gibberus Boisduval, 1835
Gonipterus humeralis Lea, 1897
Gonipterus hyperoides Pascoe, 1871
Gonipterus inconspicuus Lea, 1927
Gonipterus kanalensis Perroud & Montrouzier, 1862
Gonipterus lateritius Lea, 1927
Gonipterus lepidopterus   Schoenherr, 1840
Gonipterus lepidotus   Gyllenhaal, 1833
Gonipterus marellii   Uyttenboogaart in Marelli, 1928
Gonipterus notographus Boisduval, 1835
Gonipterus parallelicollis Lea, 1927
Gonipterus platensis Marshall, 1927
Gonipterus pulverulentus Lea, 1897
Gonipterus reticulata Boisduval, 1835
Gonipterus reticulatus Boisduval, 1835
Gonipterus rufus Blackburn, 1892
Gonipterus scabrosa Boisduval, 1835
Gonipterus scabrosus Boisduval, 1835
Gonipterus scutellatus Gyllenhaal, 1833
Gonipterus sepulchralis Pascoe, 1870
Gonipterus subfasciatus Lacordaire, 1863
Gonipterus suturalis Gyllenhaal, 1833
Gonipterus turbida Pascoe, 1871
Gonipterus xanthorrhoeae Lea, 1897

References 

Gonipterini